"Comet" is a well-known humorous children's song in North America.  It describes the deleterious effects of consuming Comet cleanser—a powdered cleansing product.  The most prominent and often-occurring effect in the song is that it turns one's teeth green.  Among other effects alleged by this song are an unappealing taste and, unsurprisingly, a tendency to vomit.

Although this song, like many in its genre, has widely variable lyrics, a common version contains the following words:

 Comet - it makes your teeth [or "lips"] turn green!;
 Comet - it tastes like gasoline [or "listerine", in the variation where your lips turn green]!;
 Comet - it makes you vomit;
 So buy [or "eat" or "get"] some Comet, and vomit, today!

The melody of the song is the "Colonel Bogey March".

In popular culture

Bart Simpson sings a version about his sister in the Simpsons episode "Stark Raving Dad"

Byron, one of the Pike triplets, sings a variation in Baby-sitters on Board!, The Baby Sitters Club Super Special #1.

See also

Hitler Has Only Got One Ball, another schoolyard song set to the "Colonel Bogey March" melody

References

Playground songs
American folk songs